The Village Caller is the sixth album led by American jazz vibraphonist Johnny Lytle which was recorded in 1964 for the Riverside label.

Reception

AllMusic awarded the album 3 stars stating "A touch lightweight at times but fun anyway... Most of the selections on this date are treated rhythmically, either R&B-ish or with a Latin feel. The results will not reward close listening, but Lytle plays well and this CD will be considered quite satisfying at parties".

Track listing
All compositions by Johnny Lytle except as indicated
 "The Village Caller" - 4:24  
 "On Green Dolphin Street" (Bronisław Kaper, Ned Washington) - 6:08  
 "Can't Help Lovin' Dat Man" (Oscar Hammerstein II, Jerome Kern) - 4:39  
 "Pedro Strodder" - 5:00  
 "Kevin Devin" - 3:23  
 "You Don't Know What Love Is" (Gene de Paul, Don Raye) - 3:59  
 "Unhappy, Happy Soul" - 7:12  
 "Solitude" (Eddie DeLange, Duke Ellington, Irving Mills) - 3:18

Personnel 
Johnny Lytle - vibraphone  
Milton Harris - organ
Bob Cranshaw  - bass
William "Peppy" Hinnant - drums
Willie Rodriguez - percussion

References 

1964 albums
Johnny Lytle albums
Riverside Records albums
Albums produced by Orrin Keepnews